Intrepid, also known as Deep Water, is a 2000 action film directed by John Putch, written by Keoni Waxman (under the name Darby Black), produced by Jim Wynorski and starring James Coburn, Costas Mandylor,  Finola Hughes, Blake Clark, Julie McCullough, and Kevin Rahm.

Cast
James Coburn as Captain Hal Josephson
Costas Mandylor as Alan Decker
Finola Hughes as Katherine Jessel
Alex Hyde-White as Colin
Larry Poindexter as First Officer "Lazo" Lazaro
Sonia Satra as Sabrina Masters
Chick Vennera as Ellerson
David Kaufman as Max Dennis
Blake Clark as Wayne
Robert Bauer as Mr. Clarence
Julie McCullough as Shannon
Brandon Maggart as The Bronco
Kevin Rahm as Steward Beck
Carol Arthur as Marcia Lowell
Michael Dean Jacobs as Mickey
Johnny Martin as Ernest
Clive Revill as Rupert Masters
David Packer as George
Warren Munson as General Moss
Michael Tylo as Tony Hersh

References

External links

2000 films
American action films
2000 action films
2000s English-language films
2000s American films